Pukzing is a village in Mamit district of Mizoram state of India.

References

Villages in Mamit district